KYOU-TV (channel 15) is a television station licensed to Ottumwa, Iowa, United States, serving the Ottumwa, Iowa–Kirksville, Missouri market as an affiliate of Fox, NBC and The CW Plus.

K30MG-D (virtual channel 15; RF channel 30) in Kirksville operates as a low-power translator of KYOU-TV, extending its over-the-air coverage into the Missouri side of the market. This station's transmitter is located northeast of Kirksville on Missouri Highway P.

History

Early history

A construction permit was granted to the Haynes Communications Company, owned by Carl Haynes, for a new commercial television station in Ottumwa on November 29, 1984. Before going on air, Haynes sold the permit for his expenses to Ottumwa Television Limited Partnership.

KOIA-TV began broadcasting on June 2, 1986, and was the second commercial station in the Kirksville–Ottumwa market. Even though this market only had one television station—KTVO in Kirksville—KOIA-TV was an independent station. It was originally intended as the successor to a low-power station that had been broadcasting on channel 42. However, the original ownership—a partnership consisting of various minority local investors and 51 percent owner Impact Television of Vienna, Virginia—was badly undercapitalized. Impact owned KOIA and low-power stations in Jackson, Tennessee; Jonesboro, Arkansas; and Oglesby, Illinois. When Impact cut financial support and stated that it had run out of money, local management immediately moved to cease broadcasting, with KOIA-TV going off the air on August 19.

Ottumwa Television Limited Partnership sold the station in the wake of the shutdown to Public Interest Broadcast Group Inc., an Orlando, Florida-based firm owned by Dean C. Engstrom and Les White, for $900. Public Interest put KOIA-TV back on the air on June 29, 1987. In addition to syndicated programs, movies, sports, and Independent Network News, the station initially offered a local news program covering the Ottumwa area, News Plus, and an interview program, Midday Magazine; studios were set up at the present site, a former McDonald's restaurant. White sold his interest to Engstrom later in the year.

On April 30, 1992, the station's call letters were changed to KYOU-TV. In January 1999, Public Interest Broadcast Group announced it would sell KYOU to Omaha-based Waitt Broadcasting for $3 million.

LMA with Raycom Media

On August 26, 2003, Waitt announced it would merge with Montgomery, Alabama-based Raycom Media for $25.7 million. That purchase created an ownership conflict within the market, as Raycom already owned KTVO at the time and could not legally keep both stations because the market does not have enough television stations to legally permit a duopoly. As a result, on September 6, 2003, Raycom – on behalf of Waitt Broadcasting – announced it would spin off the station to Charlotte, North Carolina-based Ottumwa Media Holdings (co-founded by Thomas B. Henson and Macon Moye) for $4 million.

Under the terms of the sale, Ottumwa Media Holdings entered into a local marketing agreement (LMA) with Raycom, under which it assumed some operational responsibilities for KYOU-TV. The agreement, which took effect on August 3, allowed KTVO to provide commercial scheduling, promotions, master control and production services (including local newscasts) for KYOU, while Ottumwa Media would retain responsibilities over channel 15's programming and advertising sales. (Raycom was also given an option to purchase the station outright, should FCC duopoly rules be relaxed to allow common ownership of two television stations in smaller media markets.)

On March 27, 2006, the company announced that it would sell twelve of its television stations (including KTVO) to Schaumburg, Illinois-based Barrington Broadcasting for $262 million, as part of a strategy to concentrate Raycom's broadcast portfolio on outlets in the Midwest and Southeastern U.S. following its $987 million acquisition of the Liberty Corporation's station group; the sale was finalized that August. Following the sale, Raycom continued to maintain the LMA with American Spirit Media (which Ottumwa Media Holdings was renamed in August 2006), creating the unusual situation of a company operating a station under an outsourcing agreement despite not already owning another station in that market.

KYOU-TV added an affiliation with NBC over its 15.2 digital subchannel on January 24, 2018, via a long-term agreement between the network and American Spirit Media. This returned NBC to the Ottumwa–Kirksville market for the first time since KTVO ended their secondary affiliation in 1974 and followed a failed effort by New Moon Communications to convert KUMK-LP—a former TBN translator—to an NBC affiliate in 2011. (KUMK-LP's license was cancelled in March 2014.) KYOU's subchannel superceded K27CV (channel 27), a community-owned translator of Des Moines's WHO-DT. KYOU-TV's 15.4 subchannel was converted to an affiliate for The CW Plus, replacing cable-only "KWOT" in the role, on September 1, 2018.

Sale to Gray Television
On June 25, 2018, Atlanta-based Gray Television announced an agreement with Raycom to merge their respective broadcasting assets in a $3.6 billion cash-and-stock transaction. As part of the merger, Gray also acquired KYOU and WUPV in Richmond, Virginia, which Raycom exercised its options to purchase outright from American Spirit Media. The sale to Gray was approved on December 20 and completed on January 2, 2019.

News operation
On November 2, 2015, KYOU-TV launched an in-house news operation with KYOU News Update, which involved an expansion of its West 2nd Street studios to house the operation. The initial anchor team for the 9 p.m. newscast included anchor Chase Scheuer and meteorologist Matt Holiner. After affiliating with NBC and at the insistence of the network, KYOU-DT2 debuted a 10 p.m. evening newscast on July 16, 2018, co-anchored by Scheuer and Leah Kemple, who also serves as a multimedia journalist alongside news director Pat Brink.

Technical information

Subchannels
The station's digital signal is multiplexed:

Analog-to-digital conversion
KYOU-TV discontinued regular programming on its analog signal, over UHF channel 15, on June 12, 2009, the official date in which full-power television stations in the United States transitioned from analog to digital broadcasts under federal mandate. The station's digital signal relocated from its pre-transition UHF channel 14 to channel 15.

References

External links

Fox network affiliates
NBC network affiliates
Circle (TV network) affiliates
The CW affiliates
Grit (TV network) affiliates
True Crime Network affiliates
Television channels and stations established in 1986
1986 establishments in Iowa
YOU-TV
Gray Television